Carlotta Case Hall (January 19, 1880 – 1949) was an American botanist and university professor who collected and published on ferns. She also co-authored a handbook on the plants of Yosemite National Park.

Biography
Carlotta Hall was born in Kingsville, Ohio, in 1880 to Adelaide Percy (Hardy) Case and Quincy A. Case. She studied botany at the University of California, Berkeley, graduating with a B.S. in 1904. In 1910 she married the botanist Harvey Monroe Hall, with whom she had a daughter, Martha, in 1916.

Hall became a fern collector and an assistant professor of botany at the University of California, Berkeley. She published on ferns of the Pacific Coast and co-wrote the illustrated  handbook A Yosemite Nature (1912) with her husband as a pocket-sized botanical guidebook to Yosemite National Park. The book covers more than 900 species, omitting only the grasses, sedges, and rushes.

She was a member of the California Academy of Sciences and a corresponding member of several European scientific societies. 

A species of California fern, the tufted lacefern or Carlotta Hall's lace fern (Aspidotis carlotta-halliae), is named in her honor.

Her papers, along with those of her husband and daughter, are held by UC Berkeley.

Selected publications
As author;
"Notholaena copelandii, a Newly Recognized Species of the Mexican Texano Region". J. Am Fern 40 (2), 1950, 178-187. 
"A Pellaea of Baja California". J. Am. Fern 37 (4), 1947, 111-114.
"Observations on Western Botrychiums". J. Am Fern 33 (4), 1943, 119-130. 
As editor;
The Pacific Coast Species of Polypodium. University of California, 1918. 
As co-author with Harvey Monroe Hall;
A Yosemite Nature: A Descriptive Account of the Ferns and Flowering Plants, Including the Trees, of the Yosemite National Park. P. Elder & Co. 1912.

References

American botanists
1880 births
1949 deaths
People from Kingsville, Ohio
American women botanists